Mount Zion Presbyterian Church, Mt. Zion Presbyterian Church, or Zion Presbyterian Church may refer to:

Mount Zion Presbyterian Church (Chandlersville, Ohio), listed on the National Register of Historic Places (NRHP) in Ohio
Mount Zion Presbyterian Church (Sandy Springs, South Carolina), in Anderson County, South Carolina
Mt. Zion Presbyterian Church (Bishopville, South Carolina), listed on the NRHP in South Carolina
Mt. Zion Presbyterian Church (Relfs Bluff, Arkansas), listed on the NRHP in Arkansas
Zion Presbyterian Church (Clarkson, Nebraska), listed on the NRHP in Nebraska
Zion Presbyterian Church (Columbia, Tennessee), listed on the NRHP in Tennessee